Valeri Eduardovich Pochivalin (born 11 April 1992) is a Russian football defender who plays for Veles Moscow.

Club career
He made his debut in the Russian Second Division for FC Zvezda Ryazan on 31 July 2012 in a game against FC Metallurg Lipetsk.

He made his Russian Football National League debut for FC Baltika Kaliningrad on 16 July 2016 in a game against FC Tyumen.

On 12 August 2019, he signed with FC Khimki.

On 26 June 2020, he joined Russian Premier League club Rotor Volgograd. On 9 September 2020, his Rotor contract was cancelled by mutual consent before he made any appearances for the club. On 14 September 2020 he signed with Fakel Voronezh.

References

External links
 
 

1992 births
Sportspeople from Voronezh Oblast
Living people
Russian footballers
Association football defenders
PFC Krylia Sovetov Samara players
FC Neftekhimik Nizhnekamsk players
FC Baltika Kaliningrad players
PFC Sochi players
FC Khimki players
FC Irtysh Pavlodar players
FC Rotor Volgograd players
FC Fakel Voronezh players
FC Tom Tomsk players
FC Veles Moscow players
Russian First League players
Russian Second League players
Kazakhstan Premier League players
Russian expatriate footballers
Expatriate footballers in Kazakhstan
Russian expatriate sportspeople in Kazakhstan